Kennar may refer to

Kennar Valley in Antarctica 
El Kennar Nouchfi, a town and commune in Algeria
Kennar Lewis (born 1991), Jamaican cricketer 
Richard Kennar (born 1994), Samoan rugby league footballer

See also

 
 Kennard (disambiguation)
 Kenner (disambiguation)